Måns Gahrton (born 1961) is a Swedish author.

Gahrton was born in Lund, Skåne County. He wrote his first book when he was 6 years old. He is best known for his books about Eva & Adam, Agent Annorlunda and the Bert comics. The artwork is provided by Johan Unenge.

References 

1961 births
Living people
People from Lund
Swedish male writers
Swedish comics writers